Alexis Victoria Yeb (born 12 October 1972) is a politician and businessman from the Dominican Republic.

Early life and family 
Victoria Yeb was born into the Victoria family, a political dynasty of the Dominican Republic of French origin. His parents are Dulce Yeb Raposo, of Lebanese and Portuguese ancestry, and José Victoria José, former congressman of the Dominican Republic of French and Lebanese descent. His parents are siblings of Lourdes Yeb Raposo and Arístides Victoria José (former congressman and ex Vice Minister of Labor of the Dominican Republic), respectively, the both of them parents of his predecessor Arístides Victoria Yeb, consequently, Alexis and Arístides are double cousins.

Political career 
Victoria was elected Senator for the Province of María Trinidad Sánchez in 2020.

References 

Living people
1972 births
People from Nagua
Modern Revolutionary Party politicians
Members of the Senate of the Dominican Republic
Dominican Republic people of French descent
Dominican Republic people of Lebanese descent
Dominican Republic people of Portuguese descent
White Dominicans